Colin Young (born 12 September 1944, Barbados) is a singer known for being a member of the British soul band the Foundations.

Biography
In the mid-1960s, Young came to England for a holiday with his father and decided to stay. He was a former bookkeeper who prior to joining The Foundations was lead singer of a group called Joe E. Young & The Tonicks.

Young joined The Foundations after two members, lead singer Clem Curtis and tenor saxophonist Mike Elliott left in 1968. He replaced Clem Curtis as lead singer and went on to sing on two more of The Foundations' big hits, "Build Me Up Buttercup" and "In the Bad Bad Old Days (Before You Loved Me)". He stayed with The Foundations until their break up in late 1970.

In the mid-1970s, while Clem Curtis and The Foundations were on the road after having reformed The Foundations, there was also another Foundations line-up, led by Colin Young, who were on the road at the same time and were playing basically the same material. This eventually led to court action that resulted in Clem Curtis being allowed to bill his group as either The Foundations or Clem Curtis & The Foundations. Young was allowed to bill himself as The New Foundations or Colin Young & The New Foundations.

Also in the mid-1970s, Young and his group released a lone 45 on the Pye label, "Something for My Baby" / "I Need Your Love".

In the 1980s, as the lead singer of UK group Mercy, Mercy, he had a hit with "It Must Be Heaven".

In 1999, a version of The Foundations was reformed that included Colin Young (vocals), Alan Warner (Guitar), Steve Bingham (bass), Gary Moberly (keyboards), Tony Laidlaw (sax) and Sam Kelly then Steve Dixon (drums). This version of the group was formed due to the popularity of the film There's Something About Mary and the interest created resulting from the 1968 hit "Build Me Up Buttercup" being featured in the film. Some time later Young left this version of the group and was replaced by Hue Montgomery (aka Hugh Montgomery).

In 2003 Young recorded an updated version of "Build Me Up Buttercup" backed by a choir of policemen from the Surrey police force. The proceeds from the sale of the CD go to Milly's Fund, a trust set up in memory of murdered school girl Milly Dowler. Apparently the song was a favourite of hers.

In 2010, Young appeared in Channel 4's Come Dine With Me, where he performed a song for dinner party guests. The performance was well received, but only one guest recognised him as he was number one in the year of her birth.

Discography
7" singles
 Colin Young – "Any Time at All" / "You're No Good" – UNI 55286 – 1971 (UK and German release Trend 6099 005)
 New Foundations – "Something for My Baby" / "I Need Your Love" – PYE 45533 – 1975
 Mercy, Mercy – "It Must Be Heaven" / "It Must Be Heaven" (Part 2) – Island Records – 106 996 – 1984

12 singles
 Mercy, Mercy – "It Must Be Heaven" (Dancemix Part 1) / "It Must Be Heaven" (Dancemix Part 2) – Ensign Records – 12ENY 515 – 1984
 Mercy, Mercy – "What Are We Gonna Do About It" (Extended Mix) / (Dub Mix) – Ensign Records – 12ENY 522 DJ – 1985

CD singles
 Colin Young & The Offbeats, For Milly's Fund – "Build Me Up Buttercup" / "Buttercup Too" / "No Man Is An Island" – Ripe Music RIPEMCD1 – 2003
 Colin Young and The Come Dine With Me Crew – "Woman, Get Back To the Kitchen!" – Dave Lamb Records DLCD1 – 2010

References

External links
45cat.com

1944 births
Living people
Barbadian emigrants to England
English male singers
English soul singers
The Foundations members